The 1986–87 Soviet Cup was an association football cup competition of the Soviet Union. The winner of the competition, Dinamo Kiev qualified for the continental tournament.

Competition schedule

First preliminary round
All games took place on May 2, 1986.

Second preliminary round

Round of 32

Round of 16

Quarter-finals

Semi-finals

Final

External links
 Complete calendar

Soviet Cup seasons
Cup
Cup
Soviet Cup